Peter Carlsson (born 13 April 1963) is a former professional tennis player from Sweden.

Career
Carlsson was a quarter-finalist at the Tel Aviv Open in both 1985 and 1986.

The Swede defeated Jason Stoltenberg in the opening round of the 1987 Australian Open. He lost the first two sets to John Frawley in his next match and then retired from the tournament with a shoulder injury. In the 1987 French Open he was beaten in the first round by countryman Jan Gunnarsson.

He has coached many top Swedish tennis players since retiring, including Jonas Björkman, Thomas Enqvist and Robin Söderling.

Challenger titles

Doubles: (2)

References

External links
 
 

1963 births
Living people
Swedish male tennis players
Swedish tennis coaches
Tennis players from Stockholm
20th-century Swedish people